Schistura incerta is a species of ray-finned fish in the stone loach genus Schistura. It occurs in the Pearl River basin and Han Jiang in southeast China and northern Vietnam.

References 

I
Fish described in 1931